Paul Nilbrink (born 2 May 1971) is an England-born former Swedish professional golfer who has represented Norway since 2005. He played on the Challenge Tour 1996–2008 and won the 1999 Volvo Finnish Open and the 2000 Norwegian Open.

Career
Nilbrink was born in England and grew up in Belgium and Sweden. He had a late development in golf and had a handicap of 36 by age 12 , and 13 at age 15. He later studied for a Bachelor of Science in Physical Education at the University of Central Florida in the United States.

As an amateur he fought an international match with the Swedish National Team in Hubbelrath, Germany, against Ireland, France and Germany. In addition, he was on the winning team of the Nordic golf championships at Nordcenter Finland. In 1995, he was low qualifier in the Dixie Amateur (Fort Lauderdale, Florida) with the scores of 68, 71, beating Tiger Woods by 7 shots.

Nilbrink turned professional in 1996 and joined the Challenge Tour. His best finish this season was as semi-finalist (3rd) at SM Match, and he finished the season Rookie of the Year on the PGA Sweden Order of Merit.

The following year he fought an international match with the Swedish National Team in Hubbelrath, Germany, against Ireland, France and Germany.

Nilbrink established himself as a regular player on the Challenge Tour and finished top-10 14 times, including winning the 1999 Volvo Finnish Open and the 2000 Norwegian Open. He came close to qualifying for the European Tour but missed the cut by 1 stroke, 3 times.

Nilbrink entered the 2005 European Tour qualifying school in Spain. He was in eighth place for a long time, but ultimately had to settle for a place outside the top 30, losing out on automatic entry to the Tour. He tried again to qualify for the European Tour in 2006, with the same result.

Personal life
Nilbrink, whose wife is Norwegian, relocated to Norway and took up Norwegian citizenship in late 2004.

Professional wins (9)

Challenge Tour wins (2)

Challenge Tour playoff record (2–0)

EPD Tour wins (2)

Nordic Golf League wins (2)

Other wins (3)
2009 Aegean Airlines Pro Am
2008 Dalsland Golf Resort Open 
2013 Szczecin Open
Source:

References

External links

Swedish male golfers
Norwegian male golfers
UCF Knights men's golfers
European Tour golfers
1971 births
Living people